Marc Márquez Alentà (born 17 February 1993) is a Spanish professional Grand Prix motorcycle road racer, who has raced for Honda's factory team since his MotoGP debut in 2013. Born in Cervera, Catalonia, Spain, he is nicknamed the 'Ant of Cervera' worldwide (due to his height of 1.68m), and 'el tro de Cervera' in his hometown, meaning the 'Thunder of Cervera'. He is one of four riders to have won world championship titles in three different categories, after Mike Hailwood, Phil Read and Valentino Rossi, and is one of the most successful motorcycle racers of all time, with eight Grand Prix World Championships to his name, six of which are in the premier class. Márquez became the third Spaniard after Àlex Crivillé and Jorge Lorenzo to win the premier class title, and is the most successful Spanish rider in MotoGP to date, with 59 wins.

Márquez is often considered one of the greatest innovators of modern MotoGP racing, due to his comparatively exaggerated cornering technique of leaning so far over the bike, that he seems to be "in constant danger of sliding out". He is the older brother of 2014 Moto3 world champion and 2019 Moto2 world champion Álex Márquez.

In 2014 he defended his title, winning the championship with three rounds to spare, during which he won ten races in a row. Márquez equalled the all-time Grand Prix record for pole positions at the age of 23 in 2016. Márquez secured the 2016 title with three rounds to spare at Motegi and sealed the title at Valencia in the final round of 2017. He then went on to win the  title with three races to spare and became the third highest all time Grand Prix winner. He secured the 2019 title with four races to spare at the Chang International Circuit in Buriram, Thailand, marking his 8th World Championship and 6th in the Premier Class. Márquez missed almost all of the compressed and delayed  season (he completed 26 laps of the first race, before falling) as well as the start of the 2021 season because of a broken right arm sustained in the 2020 season opener. After returning in the  season, he won three races in Germany, Austin, Misano, and had a further 2nd place in Aragon, but due to him missing the opening two, and the last two races of the season, only finished 7th overall.

Career

125cc World Championship
Born in Cervera, Catalonia, Spain, Márquez made his championship debut on 13 April 2008 at the 125cc 2008 Portuguese Grand Prix at the age of 15 years and 56 days. Márquez achieved his first podium on 22 June 2008 at the British Grand Prix, in just his sixth race in the category, becoming the youngest Spanish rider to take a podium in Grand Prix motorcycle racing.

For 2009, as a factory KTM rider, he scored another podium with his 3rd place at Jerez, before achieving his first pole position at the French Grand Prix at the age of 16 years and 89 days, becoming the youngest Spanish rider to take pole position in a motorcycle racing world championship. He also took pole for the 2009 Malaysian Grand Prix but he retired from both races. His first win came on 6 June 2010 at Mugello, and further victories at Silverstone, Assen and Barcelona in the next three races made Márquez the youngest rider to win four successive races.

He was less successful in the following races, dropping to third in the standings at one point behind Nicolás Terol and Pol Espargaró after being involved in an accident with Randy Krummenacher at the first corner at the Aragon Grand Prix. Four successive wins from Motegi onwards had moved Márquez into a 17-point lead over Terol with only one round to go. At Estoril, the race was red-flagged due to rain with Márquez running second to Terol. When returning to the grid for the second race, Márquez fell on the sighting lap and had to return to the pits. With repairs, Márquez started at the back of the field having not made it out of the pit lane before it closed five minutes prior to the start. Despite this, Márquez recovered to win the race and thus extend his lead before the Valencia finale. His tenth victory of the season moved him to within one of tying the record set by Rossi in 1997. He would fall short of tying it, as he was fourth at the final race in Valencia to become the second-youngest World Champion after Loris Capirossi, winning the smallest category at just 17 years and 263 days.

Moto2 World Championship

He finished 21st in Portugal, before taking his first victory in the class at the French Grand Prix. At his home race in Catalonia, Márquez finished second behind championship leader Stefan Bradl, before another fall at the Silverstone, having started from his first Moto2 pole position. With Bradl taking his fourth victory in the first six races, Márquez trailed him by 82 points at the end of the weekend. Márquez made a mid-season surge up the championship standings, winning six of the next seven races to move within six points of Bradl in the championship standings. In the Japanese Grand Prix, Márquez took his seventh pole position of the season but finished second to Andrea Iannone, but that finish combined with a fourth place for Bradl, allowed Márquez to take the championship lead by a point. At the Australian Grand Prix, Márquez was involved in an incident with Ratthapark Wilairot during free practice; Márquez crashed into the back of Wilairot after the session had been concluded, and for riding in an "irresponsible manner", was given a one-minute time penalty onto his qualifying time. The penalty ensured Márquez would start the race from last on the grid, but he made his way through the field, eventually finishing the race in third place. Prior to the Malaysian Grand Prix, Márquez confirmed that he would remain in Moto2 for the 2012 season, after rumours of a move into the MotoGP class. Márquez's race weekend was hampered in the opening minutes of the first free practice session, as he crashed on a damp patch of asphalt. After sitting out two further practice sessions, Márquez completed two laps in the qualifying session, but his times were only good enough for 36th on the grid. He did not start the race, as he failed a medical examination prior to the warm-up on race morning. Márquez attended the final race of the season in Valencia, in the hope of being fit to compete, but withdrew due to his continued vision problems, giving Bradl the title.

In 2012, Márquez won the Moto2 championship title after a season-long battle with fellow Spanish rider Pol Espargaró. A 3rd place for Márquez at the Australian Grand Prix, despite a win for Espargaró was enough to give him his second world title, before moving into the premier class for the  season. He took his last victory in the class at the Valencian Grand Prix, the last event of the season, despite starting from 33rd on the grid. This performance, which involved overtaking 20 bikes on the first lap alone, became the biggest comeback in the sport's history. He finished the season with nine race wins, and only finished off the podium in three races, setting records for the class that still stand. Márquez's result was enough to give Suter the constructors' title for the class.

MotoGP World Championship

Repsol Honda Team (2013–present)
On 12 July 2012, it was announced that Márquez had signed a two-year contract with the Repsol Honda team in MotoGP, replacing the retiring Casey Stoner and joining teammate Dani Pedrosa, from  onwards.

Márquez tested the Honda RC213V for the first time in Valencia after the end of the 2012 championships lapping just over a second slower than his teammate and compatriot Dani Pedrosa who topped the time sheets. Márquez was again impressive during the first official MotoGP testing at Sepang where he finished the first two days of testing at third position just behind Pedrosa and Jorge Lorenzo and ahead of Valentino Rossi in fourth before swapping places with Rossi on the final day. Márquez also did a race simulation during the closing stages of the session and his timings were consistent and phenomenal for a rookie. Márquez continued his impressive form in the private test of Honda at Austin where he topped the timesheets all three days.

2013 
Márquez started the 2013 season with a podium finish in Qatar. He qualified sixth and eventually finished third behind Jorge Lorenzo and Valentino Rossi. At the second round of the championship at the new Circuit of the Americas in Texas, Márquez beat his teammate Dani Pedrosa and became the first winner at the new track.

Márquez slipped during the third free practice session without getting injured or damaging his bike and eventually qualified third fastest at Jerez. Márquez finished the race in second position behind teammate Dani Pedrosa. At Le Mans, Márquez took the second pole of his short MotoGP career, 0.03 seconds ahead of Lorenzo. Márquez suffered a bad start to the race and spent many laps in the lower half of the top 10 however by mid-race he began to find his rhythm and progressed forward. Márquez endured a tough weekend at Mugello. After crashing his Repsol Honda on Friday morning Márquez crashed again on Friday afternoon, he had a third crash on Saturday morning practice but recovered to qualify on the second row for the race. He suffered his 4th crash of the weekend with only 3 laps to go in the race; his first non-finish since joining the premier class.

At Catalonia, Márquez finished the race in 3rd place. At Assen, Márquez suffered a huge highside in morning practice causing small fractures in the little finger of his right hand and also his left big toe. He finished the race in 3rd place. At Sachsenring, following injuries to main rivals Pedrosa and Lorenzo, Márquez took his 3rd MotoGP pole position. After an average start he worked his way to the front to lead by the end of lap five and was never again headed despite a strong late race charge from Cal Crutchlow to win by 1.5 seconds.  At Laguna Seca, Márquez replicated the overtake that Rossi made on Casey Stoner at the same corner in 2008 to pass Rossi. He won his third race of the year to extend his championship lead to 16 points over Dani Pedrosa.

At Indianapolis, Márquez grabbed pole position by 0.5 seconds from Jorge Lorenzo. In the race Márquez made an average get away and dropped behind Lorenzo and Pedrosa. On lap 12 Márquez passed Lorenzo for the lead. Lorenzo and Pedrosa were able to keep pace with Márquez for a few laps but in the final few the gap opened and Márquez took his 4th win of the year by just over 3 seconds. At Brno, the race saw an intense battle between Márquez and Lorenzo. Lorenzo made a great start off the line and led the race at the first corner. The pair proceeded to swap places on various occasions, with the final pass coming at Turn 3 with just under four laps to go; Márquez became the first rider to win four consecutive races since Valentino Rossi in 2008.

At Silverstone, during Sunday morning warm up, Márquez crashed his bike and dislocated his shoulder. The race was a fight between Márquez and Lorenzo in the early laps as they pulled away from the field. In the final laps the two front runners traded places and paint; Márquez passed Lorenzo with only a few corners remaining but was repassed and Márquez finished second. At Misano, Márquez was atop the standings once again by over half a second over Lorenzo to claim pole position. Márquez finished the race in second place behind Lorenzo. At Aragon, Márquez started from pole for the seventh time in 2013. Again Márquez lost the lead to Lorenzo in the first corner. Márquez found himself 2 seconds behind Lorenzo but soon caught up with Lorenzo and eventually crossed the line over one second ahead of him to record his sixth victory of the season. With four races left, Márquez had 278 points, 39 ahead of second-place Lorenzo.

At Sepang, Márquez took his fourth consecutive pole position. In the race Márquez made another poor start and was fighting with Rossi for third and fourth places in the first laps of the race. Márquez finished the race in second place. At Phillip Island in Australia, Márquez was disqualified from the race, reducing his championship lead over Lorenzo (who won) from 43 points to 18 with two rounds to go. At Motegi, Márquez recovered from a heavy fall on raceday morning to finish second behind Lorenzo. The result trimmed his championship lead to 13 points, meaning a fourth-place finish at Valencia would be sufficient to crown him champion even if Lorenzo won. Márquez started the race on pole, but had a bad start and fell to third. Márquez then let Dani Pedrosa do most of the early attacking on Jorge Lorenzo; Lorenzo then pushed on after a scare to win the race, Pedrosa and Márquez came second and third respectively, which was enough for Márquez to become champion, the youngest in series history.

2014 
The 2014 season started well for Márquez producing fastest times on all three days of the first Malaysian test. He then suffered a broken right leg and was unable to take part in the second Malaysian test or the Phillip Island tyre test.

The first race of the season was held at Losail in Qatar. Márquez progressed steadily through the events practice sessions and showed strong pace on Saturday afternoon to take pole position. During the race he made an average start dropping to 4th place on lap one, Márquez gradually worked his way to the front of the race and enduring a tense battle with Valentino Rossi for the second half of the race, ultimately winning by 0.259 seconds. He also went on to win the next five rounds in Texas, Argentina, Spain, France, and Italy, all from pole position.

At the Catalan Grand Prix, Márquez failed to take pole position – qualifying third after crashing during the session – but after holding off attacks from teammate Pedrosa, and Yamaha pairing Jorge Lorenzo and Rossi, Márquez was able to win his seventh race in a row, extending his championship lead to 58 over Rossi. With younger brother Álex winning the earlier Moto3 race, the Márquez brothers became the first siblings to win Grand Prix world championship races on the same day. The brothers repeated the feat at the Dutch TT two weeks later. At the German Grand Prix, Márquez again won the race, thereby becoming the youngest rider to win nine races in a row in the premier class.

With a tenth successive victory coming at Indianapolis, Márquez became the third rider to achieve such a feat in the premier class, after Mick Doohan and Giacomo Agostini.

Márquez suffered his first defeat of the season at Brno, but won the following race at Silverstone, defeating Jorge Lorenzo. At Misano, Márquez crashed while battling for the race lead with Valentino Rossi; he remounted and – with a last-lap retirement for Aleix Espargaró – was able to score one championship point. Márquez and Pedrosa crashed in heavy rain late in the race at Aragon and finished 13th and 14th, with Lorenzo winning his first race of the year after he stopped earlier from third position to change to his wet-setup motorcycle. Márquez clinched his second title at Motegi with three rounds remaining. At Phillip Island, Márquez took his 12th pole position of the season, matching Casey Stoner's record from 2011, but he crashed out while leading the race, his first non-finish since the 2013 Italian Grand Prix. At Sepang, Márquez broke Stoner's record, with his 13th pole position of the season and his 50th Grand Prix pole position. He took his 12th win of the season, matching Mick Doohan's record of most premier class victories in a single season, from 1997. Márquez's result was also good enough for Honda to claim the manufacturers' championship, with a race to spare. At the final race in Valencia, Márquez broke Doohan's record, with his 13th win of the season.

2015 
The 2015 MotoGP season started off with Márquez, once again, being the favourite to take the Championship, but he started slowly with a fifth-place finish in Qatar, after a mistake at Turn 1 dropped him to the back of the 25-rider field. He won the second race of the season in Texas, his third successive triumph at the Circuit of the Americas. In Argentina, Márquez, started from pole position, and then led the race with a maximum lead of four seconds. However, Valentino Rossi closed the gap and on lap 22 caught up to Márquez. The two riders made contact at Turn 5 with two laps remaining, with Márquez crashing out of the race to record his first non-finish since the 2014 Australian Grand Prix. He finished second behind Jorge Lorenzo in Spain, despite riding with a fractured finger on his left hand after a dirt-track accident, a week before the race. In France, Márquez took his third pole position of the season, but dropped down to seventh place at the start. He overtook Cal Crutchlow, who crashed out of the race, and on lap 22, Márquez struggled during a hard battle for fourth place with Bradley Smith and Andrea Iannone, who was riding despite his injured left shoulder, and finally Márquez finished in fourth place ahead of Iannone.

Márquez failed to finish the races in Italy and Catalunya, but returned to the podium with a second-place finish at Assen, after a race-long battle with Rossi. Márquez took successive victories in Germany, and Indianapolis, before a second-place finish at Brno. Márquez crashed out at Silverstone in wet conditions, but won at Misano. Márquez crashed out at Motorland Aragon, and a fourth-place finish in Motegi ended his hopes of retaining the title. In his 130th start, Márquez achieved his 50th Grand Prix win – becoming the ninth rider to reach that mark, and the youngest to do so, at  – with a final-lap pass on Lorenzo at the Australian Grand Prix. Márquez crashed out in Malaysia after a collision with Valentino Rossi. The incident was reviewed by Race Direction after the race, where Rossi was given three penalty points – enough to enforce a start from the back of the grid for the final race in Valencia. Márquez finished second to Lorenzo in Valencia, with Lorenzo taking the world title.

2016 
Having started off the year with a third in Qatar and a win in flag to flag Argentina due to tyre problems. Márquez made it two wins in a row with a dominant performance at the Grand Prix of the Americas in Texas with 6 second win over Lorenzo to claim an early championship lead. The first European race was held in Jerez in Spain was the first real test of Márquez' new mentality of patience and he proved it by finishing third in his home Grand Prix behind Yamaha men Rossi and Lorenzo.
Le Mans was not a good race for Márquez, as his Honda suffered from a lack of acceleration leading him to push in the braking zones to try remain in the podium battle. He ultimately finished thirteenth following a crash with Ducati's Andrea Dovizioso in turn 7 with thirteen laps remaining in the race.

After the bad result in France, Márquez and his team worked to improve the results and maintain the leadership. Their work gave them three second places in the next three races, the Italian Grand Prix, Spanish Grand Prix, and Dutch TT and first place in GoPro Motorrad Grand Prix Deutschland at the Sachsenring.
 
After these four good results, he slowed down with a fifth position at the Red Bull Ring in Austria, followed by a third position in Brno and two fourth positions at Silverstone and Misano. But then came the Aragon Grand Prix which Márquez felt really comfortable in. He said he thought it suits his riding style better and proved it by winning the race.

Márquez clinched his third MotoGP title and fifth world title overall at Motegi, Japan with three rounds remaining after Valentino Rossi and Jorge Lorenzo crashed out of the race. Márquez' team created a T-shirt with the logo "Give me five" to celebrate his fifth world title overall. The 3 last races had been at Australia, Malaysia and Valencia. At the Australian Grand Prix he crashed out of the race while leading, he then crashed while chasing the leading trio at the Malaysian Grand Prix in tricky wet conditions but remounted the bike and finished in 11th position adding 5 more points to his points tally.

Márquez finished the 2016 season with a second place at the Valencian Community motorcycle Grand Prix, after struggling to get past the likes of Valentino Rossi and Andrea Iannone in the first part of the race. Márquez managed to break away from them in the second half of the race and he began cutting down the gap to the race leader Jorge Lorenzo lap by lap which proved futile as the race drew to a close with Lorenzo crossing the finish line a second ahead of him.

2017 
Márquez started the 2017 season with a 4th-place finish in Qatar, followed by a crash while leading in Argentina. He took his first win of the year in Texas, followed by 2nd place behind teammate Pedrosa at Jerez. He then suffered a second crash of the season in France, followed by a disappointing 6th-place finish at Mugello, struggling in both races with the Honda's lack of acceleration off the corners. He finished second in Catalunya, despite suffering several crashes through practice and qualifying. He then recorded another podium finish in the Netherlands, beating Andrea Dovizioso and Cal Crutchlow in a close battle at the end of the race.

However, from then onwards fortunes started to swing in Márquez' favor, taking his eighth consecutive victory at the Sachsenring in Germany, at the same time taking the lead of the championship. He then scored back-to-back victories in the Czech Republic, after outfoxing his rivals by pitting early for slick tires on a drying track. A week later in Austria he narrowly lost out to Dovizioso in a thrilling race. He then suffered a rare engine failure at Silverstone, while Dovizioso took another victory, leaving the pair tied on points. He then fought back by taking back-to-back wins; first in a wet race in Misano, and then at his home race at Aragón. In Japan, he was again beaten in a last lap fight by Dovizioso, in a similar situation to Austria, but won a week later in Australia, in what many felt was one of the greatest races in recent years, while Dovizioso finished 13th after running off track. Márquez missed out on sealing the title in Malaysia, finishing fourth while Dovizioso won, meaning the title would go to the last round in Valencia. Márquez started the race from pole, but narrowly avoided crashing after a dramatic save at turn one, dropping from 1st to 5th position. However, moments later Dovizioso crashed at turn eight, immediately handing Márquez his 6th world title.

2018 

Márquez dominated the 2018 season, in spite of the narrow time margins in the MotoGP field, increasing his number of race wins compared to the previous two championship seasons. He started the year off by narrowly falling short of Andrea Dovizioso off the final corner in Qatar, before a controversial performance resulting in three penalties and causing Valentino Rossi to crash led to Márquez being stripped of a fifth-place finish in Argentina. Following a grid penalty of three positions for impeding Maverick Viñales costing Márquez pole position in the United States.

Márquez followed that win up by winning at Jerez, surviving a high-speed slide following gravel on the track following a crash for Thomas Lüthi. He also scored another win at Le Mans. Both wins were his first on the respective circuits for four years and gave him a commanding championship lead. Due to a crash at Mugello that lead dropped, before a 2nd-place finish in Catalonia, and wins at Assen and Sachsenring led to the commanding advantage being restored. The Sachsenring was among his most hard-fought in terms of his nine wins on the track, while he led a massive pack at Assen.

After the summer break, Ducati won successive races at Brno and in Austria. Márquez finished third in the Czech event, whereas he narrowly lost to Jorge Lorenzo on the final lap in Austria. With the Brno race winner Dovizioso finishing third in Austria, the championship lead remained strong. Following the British event being cancelled due to dangerous track conditions, Ducati took the third consecutive win at Misano with Dovizioso leading Márquez across the line.

Márquez sealed the championship after three successive hard-fought wins in duels with Dovizioso. The races at Aragon, Thailand and Japan all had in common that Dovizioso led from early in the race, until Márquez made successful late passes and held the Italian rider off. In Japan, Dovizioso fell on the penultimate lap trying to catch Márquez to attempt a re-pass, which left him without points and sealed Márquez' title once he dropped back out of the points, with Márquez cruising home for his third consecutive win and eighth overall. With three rounds to spare, Márquez reached his fifth overall MotoGP title, and sealed a third title in a row, the first rider to do so since Valentino Rossi won five in a row in the early 2000s.

He qualified on pole position in Australia, but in lap 7 he was overtaken by Andrea Dovizioso and Jack Miller, and three laps later the rear end of Márquez' bike was struck by Johann Zarco, which caused Zarco to crash and Márquez seat to malfunction, ending his race. In Malaysia, he started on seventh place, but took a ninth victory after race leader Valentino Rossi crashed out in a close battle with Márquez, who had chased him down to just a few tenths of a second, finishing only in 18th place. However, at the final race of the season at Valencia, he crashed out of the race having chosen harder wet tyres than the opposition on the soaked track.

At the end of the season, Márquez' MotoGP victory total, 44, placed him in the top five in wins all time and second for Honda in the premier class.

2019 
Recovering from a shoulder surgery, Márquez had a compromised pre-season, but still managed to take the Qatar opener to the final corner, where he ultimately fell short to Dovizioso for a second consecutive time. In Argentina, Márquez completely dominated the race from start to finish, cruising to victory with a sizeable margin. While leading in the United States for a seventh consecutive season, Márquez suddenly crashed out, attributed to a problem with the engine brake in heavy braking zones. Márquez avenged the crash by reclaiming the title lead with a composed win at Jerez, where he led from start to finish. He then won in France, pulling away after an early fight for position up front with Jack Miller.

After having to settle for second at Mugello in a three-man battle with Ducati duo Danilo Petrucci, who won the race and Dovizioso, Márquez narrowly escaped the pile-up triggered by Jorge Lorenzo losing the front end at the hairpin in Barcelona on the second lap through having overtaken Dovizioso seconds before the impact (involving Vinales, Dovizioso and lastly, Valentino Rossi, all felled in the same accident). With his four closest rivals being taken out at once, Márquez controlled the race and won with a sizeable margin, his second career win at his home region's Grand Prix. He further increased his title lead through a second-place finish at Assen, where he finished second behind Maverick Viñales, who was 100 points adrift in the standings going into the race, whereas the closer title rivals all had difficult races. Márquez fully dominated the Sachsenring round for his tenth consecutive win in all categories on the circuit, sealing his fifth win of the season and a commanding title lead over the summer break.

Márquez took his 50th career MotoGP win at the Czech round after a pole position by 2.5 seconds in tricky half-wet conditions and leading the race from start to finish.

Márquez won his 6th premier class championship and 8th world championship after winning a last lap battle with Fabio Quartararo in the 2019 Thailand MotoGP at the Buriram International Circuit. Márquez closed out the season in commanding fashion, winning three of the four final races after his championship had been sealed. In the penultimate round, however, he did injure his other shoulder in qualifying. He recovered to finish second in the race, but required post-season surgery once more. Márquez ended the season with 12 wins and 420 points, placing him 151 points ahead of Andrea Dovizioso. This meant Márquez had more than six race wins worth of points championship margin.

2020 
In the pre-season, Márquez signed a new four-year deal with Honda, extending his stay with the marque until the end of 2024. This unusually long contract took Márquez out of the market for the normal bi-annual contract cycle, and also for the 2023 season.
In the first round of the championship in Jerez, he fell off his bike while chasing Fabio Quartararo for the lead of the race. The fall broke the humerus in his right arm and he did not finish the race, which was won by Quartararo. Márquez returned to Jerez for the Andalucía GP, only a few days after his first surgery, on 21 July 2020, to repair his broken humerus. He participated in FP4 of the Saturday of the race weekend, only to declare that he had too much pain in his recently injured arm. He withdrew from the GP, as Quartararo went on to win again. Márquez missed the rest of the year, and the first two races of the next season.

2021 
Márquez was expected to make his return in 2021. After missing the opening two races held in Qatar, he announced his return ahead of the Portuguese Grand Prix in Portimão, ending in a seventh place, taking nine points. After a ninth place finish in Jerez, Márquez suffered three consecutive DNFs (including one in Le Mans, where he had found himself leading the race in rainy conditions). For the German Grand Prix, Márquez qualified on the second row. In the race, he got into the lead in the early laps and held onto it, to take his first win in 581 days, and his 11th consecutive win at the Sachsenring. Márquez followed this up with two point scoring finishes in Assen and Austria, a 2nd place in Aragón, a 4th place in Rimini, and then consecutive wins at Austin and Misano. Despite his two wins, he was eliminated from the championship contention, and so he sat out the final two races of the season in Portimao and Valencia, choosing to focus on the total rehabilitation for next season. Márquez still ended the year with four podiums, three of which were victories, 142 points, and 7th in the rider's championship. During the 2021 season he crashed a total of 22 times in 14 races.

2022 
At the first race of the season at Losail, Márquez finished in fifth place.
 
During practice for the second GP of the season, the Indonesian Grand Prix at Mandalika, Márquez crashed three times in practice. After a fourth crash, a violent highside during a warm-up session prior to the race, he was rushed to hospital. He was uninjured but declared unfit for the race. After further checks in Spain he was diagnosed with diplopia, a condition he had suffered with before. His absence from the third race of the season, the Argentine Grand Prix, was covered by Honda test rider Stefan Bradl. Márquez was later sidelined indefinitely beginning with the Catalan round, after having a fourth surgery on his right humerus at the Mayo Clinic to correct a 30-degree rotation of the bone. He was replaced for all races by Honda test rider Stefan Bradl. Despite missing 5 of 11 races, Márquez remained the top Honda rider in the standings going into the season's summer break. Márquez returned to racing at the Grand Prix of Aragon, but championship leader Fabio Quartararo crashed into the back of Márquez, taking Quartararo out of the race, followed by Marquez colliding with Takaaki Nakagami due to Quartararo's bodywork trapped in a wheel, both retiring. A week later he would achieve the 91st pole position of his career at the Grand Prix of Japan in wet conditions, after almost three years without a pole. He finished the race in 4th. He would later achieve the feat of 100 podiums in the premier class at the Australian Grand Prix, taking Honda's second podium of the year.

2023 
Márquez is due to stay with Repsol Honda team for the 2023 season.

Career statistics

CEV Buckler 125cc Championship

Races by year
(key) (Races in bold indicate pole position, races in italics indicate fastest lap)

Grand Prix motorcycle racing

By season

By class

Races by year
(key) (Races in bold indicate pole position, races in italics indicate fastest lap)

Records
After round number 19 in Valencia of the 2019 season, Marc Márquez holds the following records:

MotoGP

Youngest rider to win his first World Championship Title in the Premier Class
Youngest rider to win 2 World Championship Titles in the Premier Class
Youngest rider to win 3 World Championship Titles in the Premier Class
Youngest rider to win 4 World Championship Titles in the Premier Class
Youngest rider to win 5 World Championship Titles in the Premier Class
Youngest rider to win 6 World Championship Titles in the Premier Class
Youngest race winner in the Premier Class
Most Races won in a single season in the Premier Class: 13
Youngest rider to take 12 Pole positions in a single season in Premier Class: 
Only rider to claim 13 Pole positions in a single season in the Premier Class
4 successive podium positions in first 4 Premier Class Grand Prix starts (shared with Max Biaggi)
Most podium finishes in a single season in the Premier Class: 18 
Highest points in a single season in the Premier Class: 420
Biggest title-winning margin by points: 151
First rider to win Intermediate Class and Premier Class titles back to back
Most Fastest laps in a MotoGP season: 12 (shared with Valentino Rossi)
Youngest rider to win 12 races in a single season: 
Youngest rider to take four pole positions in a row in the Premier Class (Silverstone-Misano-Aragon-Malaysia 2013)
Youngest rider to lead the Premier Class championship
Youngest rider to win 4 races back to back in Premier Class
Youngest Rider to win 5 races in a row in the Premier Class
Youngest Rider to win 6 races in a row in the Premier Class
Youngest Rider to win 7 races in a row in the Premier Class
Youngest Rider to win 8 races in a row in the Premier Class
Youngest Rider to win 9 races in a row in the Premier Class
Youngest Rider to win 10 races in a row in the Premier Class
Youngest Rider to win 11 races in a single season in the Premier Class
Most Consecutive race wins in the Premier Class in 4 Stroke MotoGP (2002–) era: 10
Most Consecutive race wins in a single Premier Class season (1949–) era: 10 (Shared with Mick Doohan and Giacomo Agostini)
Youngest rider to win back to back championships in the Premier Class
Most Pole Positions from Start Of Season in 4 Stroke MotoGP (2002–) era: 6
First rookie to win 4 races back to back in the Premier Class: (Germany-USA-Indianapolis-Czech Republic 2013)
Most wins as a rookie in the Premier Class: 6
Most pole positions as a rookie in the Premier Class: 9
Most podium finishes as a rookie in the Premier Class: 16
Most points scored as a rookie in Premier Class: 334
First rookie to claim 4 consecutive pole positions in the Premier Class
Only Spanish rider to win 2 titles back to back in the Premier Class
Most Pole Positions in the Premier Class: 62

Moto2

Most wins in the Moto2 Class: 16
Most podium finishes in a single season in the Moto2 Class: 14
Most wins in a single season in the Moto2 Class: 9

125cc

Most pole positions in a season of 125cc World Championship: 12

All Categories

Youngest rider to win 3 World Championship Titles
Youngest rider to win 4 World Championship Titles
Youngest rider to win 5 World Championship Titles
Youngest rider to win 6 World Championship Titles
Youngest rider to win 7 World Championship Titles
Youngest rider to win 8 World Championship Titles
Youngest rider in the history of Grand Prix motorcycling to achieve 50 wins
Youngest rider in the history of Grand Prix motorcycling to achieve 60 wins
Youngest rider in the history of Grand Prix motorcycling to achieve 70 wins
Youngest rider in the history of Grand Prix motorcycling to achieve 80 wins
Most Pole Positions in history of Grand Prix motorcycling: 91
Youngest rider to win 5 successive Grands Prix (Mugello, Silverstone, Assen, Barcelona, Sachsenring 2010)
Most wins as a teenager in all classes: 26
Youngest rider to win at least 1 race in 3 classes of GP Racing
Youngest Spanish rider to take a pole position
First rider to claim pole position having taken part in Qualifying 1 (Thailand 2018)
One of only pair of brothers to win Grand Prix motorcycle racing world championships, 2014 and 2019 with Álex Márquez
All-time wins leader (consecutive from 2013 to 2018 ) at the Circuit of the Americas: 6
Most consecutive pole positions at the Circuit of the Americas : 7
First/Only Rider in history to win 8 times consecutively at the same circuit: Sachsenring
Most consecutive wins at Sachsenring Circuit: 11
Most consecutive pole positions at Sachsenring Circuit: 10
First/Only rider in history to win 11 times consecutively at the same circuit: Sachsenring
Most consecutive wins at Indianapolis Motor Speedway: 5
First/Only rider in history to win 5 times at the Misano Circuit

Personal life
Although Márquez has won several championships, he has always turned down using the number 1 as a racing number, favouring his #93 – which is the year of his birth. The 93 is displayed with white text and a red background on his bike and in official merchandise, being compatible with Honda's red-orange-navy blue livery. Márquez' father Julià has followed him around the world in his team garage and is a permanent fixture in the Grand Prix paddock, while his mother's appearances are rarer. His younger brother Álex Márquez is also a motorcycle racing world champion, having won the Moto3 class in 2014 and the Moto2 class in 2019. The duo became the first pair of brothers to win road racing world championships the same season and repeated the feat again in 2019. Five years earlier, Márquez jokingly referred to him preferring bikes over girls in a 2014 interview, but conceded it was a  "difficult question" and also added that in spite of him being unafraid on a bike, he'd never go out on a boat at sea. Aside from his native tongues of Catalan and Spanish, Márquez is a fluent speaker of English. Even after becoming world champion, rather than moving to a tax haven like many fellow racers, he still lives in his home town of Cervera, with his website citing "training opportunities" on dirt bikes in the location as "ideal". His official fanclub is also located in Cervera, chaired by his uncle Ramón, adjacent to an exhibition at the town museum where memorabilia including championship-winning bikes are displayed. Márquez is also involved with several charities. He was in a relationship with Blanco Romero's daughter Lucia Romero Ezama.

Marquez motif since 2012 has been the Ant. This can be seen on various gloves, helmets and pit boards he and his team uses. The reasoning behind this has been when he started out riding motorcycles, his size was diminutive that the team had to add ballast to his bikes to compensate for his lack of weight. Therefore, his team nicknamed him an ant for the comparison of the animal which is so small but has the strength to carry 100 times as much as its body weight.
As of October 2018 on the day of his fifth MotoGP title, Márquez had close to 4 million Facebook followers, being one of the largest motor racers and Spanish athletes on the platform. A Roman Catholic, Márquez along with four other MotoGP riders met Pope Francis at the Vatican in September 2018. Márquez is a fan of football club FC Barcelona, and has visited the club and its first team in the past.

See also
 List of motorcycle Grand Prix wins by Marc Márquez

References

External links

Marc Márquez – Profile at the official MotoGP website
Marc Márquez Leathers

1993 births
Living people
People from Segarra
Sportspeople from the Province of Lleida
Spanish motorcycle racers
Repsol Honda MotoGP riders
125cc World Championship riders
Moto2 World Championship riders
Motorcycle racers from Catalonia
Laureus World Sports Awards winners
Spanish Roman Catholics
MotoGP World Championship riders
MotoGP World Riders' Champions
Moto2 World Riders' Champions
125cc World Riders' Champions